New Don Pedro Dam, often known simply as Don Pedro Dam, is an earthen embankment dam across the Tuolumne River, about  northeast of La Grange, in Tuolumne County, California. The dam was completed in 1971, after four years of construction, to replace the 1924 concrete-arch Don Pedro Dam.

The dam serves mainly for irrigation water storage, flood control and hydroelectricity production, and impounds Don Pedro Reservoir in the foothills of the Sierra Nevada.

The New Don Pedro Dam is owned and operated by the Modesto Irrigation District (MID) and Turlock  Irrigation District (TID).

The original dam was named for the old mining town of Don Pedros Bar on the Tuolumne River, which in turn takes its name from prospector Pierre "Don Pedro" Sainsevain.

Background

Shortly after their formation in 1887, the MID and TID acquired water rights to the Tuolumne River to secure a water supply for their combined  service area in the San Joaquin Valley. After selling revenue bonds totaling $4.1 million, the two irrigation districts began construction of the Don Pedro Dam (now known as Old Don Pedro Dam) in 1921, about  upriver of the present location of New Don Pedro Dam. The dam's 15 megawatt (MW) hydroelectric plant, later expanded to 37.5 MW, delivered its first power in October 1923.

Expanding Don Pedro or constructing a new dam altogether was first seriously considered in the 1940s because the existing dam could only store a year's supply of water for valley farmers, with no guarantee that a multiyear drought could be weathered. An enlarged Don Pedro would provide a "bank" of water storage for prolonged droughts, capture more spring runoff, and provide increased flood control. Another proponent of a high dam was the city of San Francisco, which also sought a share of the Tuolumne's water and decided to cooperate with the irrigation districts to construct the new dam. The U.S. Bureau of Reclamation made tentative studies for a high dam on the Tuolumne River as part of its Central Valley Project, though it later dropped the plans in favor of other sites.

Construction

In 1961, an overwhelming majority of voters in the TID and MID service areas and San Francisco approved bond issues to finance the construction of a new dam. The irrigation districts hoped to complete the dam by 1966, but concerns that the dam would further impact decreasing populations of king salmon in the Tuolumne put a temporary stop to the project. In fact, it was not until that year that the Federal Power Commission (now Federal Energy Regulatory Commission) licensed the irrigation districts to go ahead on New Don Pedro.

The $49.7 million primary construction contract for the dam was awarded to Guy F. Atkinson Company on August 22, 1967. When he first saw the dam site, chief engineer John Goodier was reported to have said "[it'd be a] tough nut to crack". Clearing the dam site began immediately afterwards, in addition to the construction of access roads and a camp for construction workers. Construction of the dam's service spillway began a week later on August 29. On September 22, 1967, work began on the diversion tunnel that would allow the river to bypass the construction site. The  tunnel was fully excavated by March 13 of the following year and lined with reinforced concrete by August. On September 7, a  cofferdam was constructed and the diversion tunnel began to carry the flow of the Tuolumne. As the dam site dried out, the foundations were excavated down to bedrock; cracks in the rock were injected with so-called "dental concrete" to stabilize the foundation.

Construction of the embankment began on September 16, 1968 using the hydraulic fill method. The dam's massive concrete emergency spillway was completed on January 19, 1969. However, severe flooding on January 26 destroyed the cofferdam and all of the construction site's bridges, putting work a month behind schedule. Cleanup proceeded at a rapid pace and placing of impervious material for the dam's core commenced on February 27. The workforce peaked at 500 men in mid-1969 and on December 10, the service spillway was completed. On May 28, 1970, the embankment was finally topped out with the last of over 250,000 truckloads of material.

The rising lake submerged Old Don Pedro Dam on April 12, 1970 and inundated the Gold Rush town of Jacksonville by June. The powerhouse and penstocks were completed by August 1970, after lengthy delays and setbacks due to the sheer scale of the generators, pipes and gates used in their construction. Some of the individual components were so heavy that a truck delivering one of the penstock sections sank up to its trailer bed in the road, and another was crushed when the driver braked, inadvertently snapping the chains that held the load in place.

The total cost of the New Don Pedro Dam project, including site preparations, reservoir clearing and road relocations, was $115,679,000. The dam was formally dedicated on May 22, 1971 to a crowd of over 3,000 people. Among the dedication ceremonies were a speech by San Francisco mayor Joseph Alioto and a beef barbecue hosted by TID.

Design and usage
High water releases are controlled by four sets of gates.

The hydroelectric plant at the base of the dam has four generators capable of producing 203 MW combined. The TID's share is 139 MW or 68.47%, while MID receives 64 MW or 31.53%. Three generators, each with a capacity of 55 MW, were included in the original design of the dam while an additional 38 MW generator was incorporated in 1989. The plant generates an average of 618.4 million kilowatt hours (KWh) of electricity each year, equal to an average output of 70.6 MW. The cities of Modesto and Turlock receive a large share of their power supplies from New Don Pedro Dam.

The flood control reservation is one of the smallest among major California reservoirs because it allows for more water to be stored for power generation, but this has often resulted in inadequate flood protection such as in 1997 when the dam released more than  – almost six times the capacity of downstream levees. The bottom  is considered dead storage, or the lowest point at which water can be released to generate power.

During construction of the dam, it was anticipated that the large size and scenic location of the reservoir, coupled with its proximity to urban centers, would make it a large tourist draw. A $40,000 plan was put forth to develop the reservoir for recreational activities. This entailed the construction of campsites, picnic areas, boat ramps, a landing strip, and hiking trails, including on 14 of the 33 islands in the lake. Don Pedro has become a popular summer destination in Central California, attracting 360,000–400,000 visitors each year.

Future development
In 1923, the same year that Old Don Pedro was completed, the City of San Francisco finished construction of O'Shaughnessy Dam, which forms a reservoir in the upper Tuolumne River's Hetch Hetchy Valley and is the focus of one of the most longstanding environmental controversies in United States history. Proponents of the dam's removal, including former Sierra Club president David Brower, suggest raising New Don Pedro Dam to replace the storage that would be lost with the draining of Hetch Hetchy.

TID is currently investigating the feasibility of constructing a large pumped-storage hydroelectric plant on Lake Don Pedro in order to better meet peaking power demands without releasing extra water at New Don Pedro Dam. Water would be pumped into this new reservoir using power generated at New Don Pedro Dam during periods of low electricity demand, while during high demand water would be released through a penstock to an 880 MW generating facility. As of September 2011, poor economic conditions had put the project "on hold indefinitely".

See also

La Grange Dam
List of dams and reservoirs in California
List of largest reservoirs of California
List of power stations in California
List of the tallest dams in the United States
Raker Act

References

Works cited

External links
Live hydrologic data for Don Pedro Reservoir
Red Mountain Bar pumped-storage plant proposal
Turlock Irrigation District History

Dams in California
Dams on the Tuolumne River
Buildings and structures in Tuolumne County, California
Embankment dams
Hydroelectric power plants in California
United States local public utility dams
Dams completed in 1971
Energy infrastructure completed in 1971
1971 establishments in California